Teen (stylised as Te3n) is a 2016 Indian Hindi-language mystery thriller film written and directed by Ribhu Dasgupta. This remake of the 2013 South Korean film Montage stars Amitabh Bachchan, Nawazuddin Siddiqui, Sabyasachi Chakraborty, Padmavati Rao, and Vidya Balan in the lead roles. It was released on 10 June 2016. The film was a commercial failure at the box office.

Plot 
John Biswas (Amitabh Bachchan) is a 70-year-old grandfather who visits the police station regularly. He is desperate to find the kidnapper and murderer of his granddaughter Angela, who died eight years ago. Police inspector Sarita Sarkar (Vidya Balan) has no clues about the case. But she continues to search for the person who caused it, despite being discouraged by people all around her and collects evidence one by one at a slow pace.

John's wife Nancy (Padmavati Rao) is sick and uses a wheelchair. Despite personal problems, John is determined not to give up. John also regularly meets Father Martin Das (Nawazuddin Siddiqui), who was a police inspector and was handling the Angela kidnapping case. Father Martin Das tries his best in solving the case, but the guilt of being unsuccessful compelled him to leave his job and become a priest.

One day, eight years after that tragic incident, there is another kidnapping, that of a boy named Rony. Everything about it echoes the kidnapping of Angela. Further investigation reveals that the modus operandi for kidnapping Rony is the same as that of Angela. Inspector Sarita requests Father Martin for assistance in cracking the case. Martin supports partially by providing clues and Sarita, with John, start investigating the case.

Since the modus operandi was the same, Angela's case file is re-opened. Rony's grandfather, Manohar (Sabyasachi Chakraborty) is arrested when he tries to flee with the ransom at the railway station. Sarita interrogates him in the lock-up, but he says he was acting under the instructions of the real kidnapper.

In the meantime, John doggedly pieces together the identity of Angela's kidnapper from little bits of information that he collects through his own investigations. It is eventually revealed that these scenes take place before Rony's kidnapping, as John discovers that Manohar was the one who had kidnapped Angela and subsequently creates a plan to kidnap Rony to seek revenge and justice.

Father Martin finds out that John kidnapped Rony and confronts him. John requests Martin to arrange a meeting with Manohar. During the meeting, John makes Manohar confess to his crimes. Manohar explains that he kidnapped Angela to pay for his daughter's open heart surgery.

It is revealed that Angela was not murdered — while being held captive, she escaped and accidentally fell from a height on to a moving car and died. The car was driven by Father Martin Das, who was injured in the accident.

Cast

 Amitabh Bachchan as John Biswas
 Nawazuddin Siddiqui as Father Martin Das
 Vidya Balan as Sarita Sharma
 Sabyasachi Chakrabarty as Manohar Sinha
 Padmavati Rao as Nancy Biswas, wife of John Biswas
 Aarnaa Sharma as Angela Roy
 Tota Roy Chowdhury as Peter Roy, Angela's father
 Ricky Patel as Rony Poddar
 Anupam Bhattacharya as Hemant Poddar, Rony's father
 Deblina Chakravorty as Neeta, Rony's mother
 Mukesh Chhabra as Tariq, real estate agent
 Prakash Belawadi as Kumar
 Masood Akhtar as Imambara official
 Phalguni Chatterjee as LMO officer
 Arun Saha as LMO clerk 
 Arindol Bagchi as orphanage clerk
 Antara Banerjee as bride in church
 Abhipriti Das as deaf and mute girl
 Mohammad Arif as groom in church
 Paritosh Sand as ACP
 Biswajeet Das as church patron
 Indira Dutta Choudhury as maid
 Sujata Ghosh as constable
 Pratap Rana as peon
 Rajat Das as hawker
 Sagnik as Bhaskor
 Satyam Majumdar as LMO manager
 Suneel Sinha as Hari Prakash
 Soumyajit Majumdar as Hari Prakash's manager

Production
Shooting started on 24 November 2015 with Vidya Balan and Nawazuddin Siddiqui at Writers' Building, Kolkata. It is the first Hindi film for which the doors of the Victorian-era Writers' Building were opened for shooting. Many parts of the movie were also shot in the historic heritage site of St. Paul's Cathedral, Kolkata. Actor Amitabh Bachchan was reported to join the crew on 27 November 2015. The movie was shot in Kolkata. Shooting wrapped up on 31 January 2016.

The trailer was released on 5 May 2016.

In May 2016, Bachchan revealed that the rights of the 2013 South Korean movie had been officially purchased by Sujoy Ghosh.

Music

Clinton Cerejo composed the music and background score of the film while Amitabh Bhattacharya wrote the lyrics. The audio album of the movie was released on 27 May which was accompanied by a live performance by Vishal Dadlani on the song "Grahan". The album consists of five tracks sung by Clinton Cerejo, Vishal Dadlani, Benny Dayal, Divya Kumar and Bianca Gomes.

Amitabh Bachchan recorded a version of song "Kyun Re" for the film. The song depicts the pain of a grandpa who has lost his granddaughter. The music rights were acquired by T-Series.

Track listing

Release
The film released in about 373 screens in various countries with about 93 screens in USA, 80 in UAE, 51 in Pakistan, 30 in UK, 20 in Kenya, 17 in Australia, 15 in Tanzania, 12 in Canada, over 9 screens in Malaysia and other countries.

References

External links
 

2016 films
2010s Hindi-language films
Indian thriller films
Films shot in Kolkata
Films about kidnapping in India
Indian remakes of South Korean films
Films scored by Clinton Cerejo
Films with screenplays by Ritesh Shah
Reliance Entertainment films
2016 thriller films
Hindi-language thriller films
Films directed by Ribhu Dasgupta